Chagunius is a genus of cyprinid fish containing three species which occur in South and Southeast Asia.

Species
There are currently three recognized species in this genus:
 Chagunius baileyi Rainboth, 1986
 Chagunius chagunio (F. Hamilton, 1822) (Chaguni)
 Chagunius nicholsi (G. S. Myers, 1924)

References

Cyprinidae genera
Cyprinid fish of Asia